Thomas Cosgrove (June 12, 1829 – March 27, 1912) was an Irish soldier who received the Medal of Honor for valor during the American Civil War.

Biography
Cosgrove joined the Army from Stoughton, Massachusetts in August 1862, and mustered out with his regiment in June 1865.  He received the Medal of Honor on November 7, 1896 for his actions at Drury's Bluff, Virginia on May 15, 1864.

Medal of Honor citation
Citation:

Individually demanded and received the surrender of 7 armed Confederates concealed in a cellar, disarming and marching them in as prisoners of war.

See also

List of American Civil War Medal of Honor recipients: A-F

References

External links

Military Times

1842 births
1919 deaths
Union Army soldiers
United States Army Medal of Honor recipients
American Civil War recipients of the Medal of Honor